The 2020 Belo Horizonte municipal election took place in the city of Belo Horizonte, Brazil, taking place on 15 November 2020 in a single round. Voters voted to elect the Mayor, the Vice Mayor and 41 city councillors for the administration of the city.
The result was a single round victory for incumbent mayor Alexandre Kalil of the Social Democratic Party (PSD), winning 784,307 votes and a share of 63.36% of the popular, defeating state deputy Bruno Engler of the Brazilian Labour Renewal Party (PRTB), who took 123,215 votes and a share of 9.95% of the popular vote.

Originally, the elections would occur on 4 October (first round) and 25 October (second round, if necessary). However, with the growing of cases and deaths caused by the COVID-19 pandemic in Brazil, the dates were delayed.

Political context and pandemic
The 2020 municipal elections were directly affected by the COVID-19 pandemic, forcing the parties to remodel their campaign strategies. The Superior Electoral Court authorized the parties to do digital conventions, in order to avoid crowds. Some parties launched their pre-candidacies through digital media. Besides that, from this election, the Constitutional Amendment 97/2017 took force, prohibiting party coalitions in legislative elections (federal, state or municipal).

Candidates

Opinion polls

Published after the campaign's start

Published before the campaign's start

Results

Mayor

Municipal Chamber

Notes

References

Belo Horizonte
November 2020 events in Brazil
Elections postponed due to the COVID-19 pandemic